Réaux may refer to:

 Réaux, Charente-Maritime, a commune of the Charente-Maritime departement in France

People with the surname
 Gédéon Tallemant des Réaux (1619–1692), French writer
Raymond Reaux (born 1940), French cyclist

See also
 Reaux, Reaux, Reaux Your Boat, a short film in the Inspector series of theatrical cartoons